Telecommunications mediation is a process that converts call data to pre-defined layouts that can be imported by a specific billing system or other OSS applications.

Mediation platform 

They are often referred to as internet protocol detail records. Mediation also processes event detail records or EDRs that are usually generated by the charging systems or any other network elements. Hence, Mediation platforms can process all xDRs that are generated by any network element, be it CDR, EDR or UDR.

Naming 

Billing mediation platforms get their name from their behavior: they "mediate" data between systems. In a typical telephone company scenario, the systems providing data to the mediation platform are network elements, such as telephone switches, and the systems receiving data from the mediation platform perform accounting, auditing, archiving, or bill-generation functions. The mediation system collects, collates and prepares data for consumption by the downstream systems, which often accept data only in a limited set of formats.

Data types 

The usage and call detail record datatypes hold data such as NPX, NPA, call duration, peak time flag and call length. Data may be represented in ascii or binary formats. The billing mediation platform typically reads this data and converts it into common normalized format.

Billing systems and all other downstream systems, in turn, converts this data to component [its own] understandable format.

Functionality 

Typically a mediation platform is used for the following tasks:
 Collection and validation of call detail records 
 Filtering out of non billing-relevant call detail records
 Collating 
 Correlation of different input sources call detail records
 Aggregation of partial call detail records related to the same call 
 Format change and call detail record normalization 
 Business transformation of data

In a telecom billing scenario, mediation is the first step after receiving a call detail record. The mediated call detail record files are forwarded to a rating engine, which calculates the charge associated with the call detail records. In today's world, Rating Engines are becoming more necessary for the telecom billing system to be able to meet the growing variant customer needs for different services.

Despite the name, not all of the data transferred via billing mediation platforms is actually used for billing purposes. For instance, the mediation software might generate traffic volume statistics based on the number and origin of the records it processes. Those statistics could then be used for capacity planning, as part of a network monitoring procedure, or for any other business intelligence applications.

At core, mediation involves data transfer between various systems with or without modification of data starting from Network elements to any OSS/BSS systems.

Sophisticated billing mediation software serves end to end functionality for telecom operators. Mediation software performs various operations from data collection to downstream distribution to modules like retail billing, roaming, interconnect settlement, business intelligence, fraud detection and revenue assurance.

Following list provides insight on mediation software activities

 Collection and archiving
 Decoding/Encoding 
 Normalization (common format) 
 Filtering 
 Conversion 
 Validation 
 Record enrichment (using complex reference data) 
 Duplicate record detection
 Aggregation or Correlation 
 Buffering 
 Cloning 
 Sorting 
 Downstream format mapping 
 Header and trailer generation 
 Downstream distribution 
 Error messaging and alarms 
 Auditing and reports 
 Reconciliation 
 Reference data configuration 
 Provisioning services for the subscription

Complementary to billing mediation functions, comprehensive mediation platforms also provide functionality dedicated to Service Provisioning (the two areas frequently intermix as services configured and used by the end customer result in usage data records generation in the network).

Mediating between the systems is not the only job that Mediation Platform can do. Actually this can be used as a provisioning agent. The basic provisioning commands can be configured within the mediation system and whenever we get a request for the system which does the provisioning, the request can be converted into a file, in which mediation can append the service provisioning commands and send it to the Home Location Register (HLR) for activating any request. This of course, load dependent but can come very handy when there is a crisis in the other system.

Supported systems 
Telecom operators offer Voice, video, data, fax and internet services to subscribers and partners on various product lines. Mediation products are tuned to provide solutions for complex business challenges. The call data is produced by network devices in the form of call detail record).

Mediation platforms for telecom practice support various systems:
 Retail Billing
 Wholesale Billing - National and International 
 Network Traffic Management Tools
 Data Warehousing Systems
 Business Intelligence / Big Data Systems
 Reconciliation Systems 
 Fraud Management Systems
 Provisioning feed to sub-systems 
 RA - Revenue Assurance Systems
 ICT - Information and Communication Technology Systems
 Assurance Insight Synap System

References

Telecommunications economics